ECgene in computational biology is a database of genomic annotations taking alternative splicing events into consideration.

See also
 Alternative splicing
 Alternative Splicing Annotation Project
 AspicDB
 ChimerDB
 TassDB

References

External links
 https://web.archive.org/web/20130811031503/http://genome.ewha.ac.kr/ECgene/

Genetics databases
RNA
RNA splicing
Gene expression